Jan Howard Sings Evil on Your Mind is a studio album by American country artist, Jan Howard. It was released in July 1966 via Decca Records and contained 12 tracks. It was the second studio album of Howard's music career and her first with the Decca label. The disc combined new recordings with cover tunes. Among its songs was the title track, which was one of the four singles included on the album. It became top five single on the American country chart in 1966 while the album itself reached the top ten of the American country albums chart around the same time.

Background, recording and content
Jan Howard had her first commercial success with 1960's "The One You Slip Around With". The song rose to the top 15 of the country charts and was recorded through Challenge Records. She then recorded briefly for Capitol Records but failed to have success. She then moved to Decca Records where she would have her greatest commercial success. Howard's Decca producer, Owen Bradley, found it difficult to market her. Realizing that she could not be molded into the musical style of her Decca label mates (Brenda Lee and Loretta Lynn), Bradley began finding songs that gave her more individuality. Then, Bradley and Howard found a song that would help make her mold together her second studio album called "Evil on Your Mind".

The song was penned by Jan's husband (and Nashville songwriter), Harlan Howard. Along with several other songs Bradley found, they would comprise her second album. Jan Howard Sings Evil on Your Mind was recorded at the Columbia Studio (located in Nashville, Tennessee) in sessions held between September 1964 and May 1966. Owen Bradley produced all of the album's recording sessions. The disc contained a total of 12 tracks. Along with the title track, four songs were composed by Harlan Howard for the project: "What Makes a Man Wander", "You Don't Find a Good Man Everyday" and "You Really Know". One song penned by Jan herself was also included called "Crying for Love". Also included was a cover of Bill Phillips's top ten country single, "Put It Off Until Tomorrow" and Gale Garnett's top ten pop single, "We'll Sing in the Sunshine".

Release, chart performance and singles
Jan Howard Sings Evil on Your Mind was released in July 1966 on Decca Records. It was Howard's first full-length album released on the label and the second released in her recording career. It was originally issued as a vinyl LP, containing six songs on either side of the record. That year, the record peaked at number ten on the Billboard Magazine Top Country Albums chart, becoming her very first album to peak within any Billboard record chart. Of its four singles included, its most commercially-successful was the title track. It was originally released by Decca in April 1966. The song climbed to the number five position on the American Billboard Hot Country Songs in 1966, becoming her highest-peaking solo single in her career.

Three other singles were also included on the album that were previously released. The earliest single released was "What Makes a Man Wander", which was first issued by Decca in October 1964. It was the only other single included on the album that made the Billboard Hot Country Songs chart, climbing to number 25 in late 1964. A second single included on the disc was "I've Got Feelings Too", which was first issued in May 1965. A third single included on the album was "You Don't Find a Good Man Everyday". It was first released in October 1965.

Track listing

Personnel 
All credits are adapted from the liner notes of Jan Howard Sings Evil on Your Mind.

Musical and technical personnel
 Harold Bradley – guitar
 Owen Bradley – producer
 Floyd Cramer – piano
 Pete Drake – steel guitar
 Ray Edenton – guitar
 Buddy Harman – drums
 Jan Howard – lead vocals
 The Jordanaires – background vocals
 Grady Martin – guitar
 Bob Moore – bass
 Hargus Pig Robbins – piano
 Pete Wade – guitar

Chart performance

Release history

References 

1966 albums
Albums produced by Owen Bradley
Decca Records albums
Jan Howard albums